Take no prisoners is an informal military term for giving no quarter. The phrase may also refer to:

 Take No Prisoners (2008), a professional wrestling event held by Ring of Honor
 Take No Prisoners (2009)
 Take No Prisoners (Peabo Bryson album)
 Take No Prisoners (David Byron album)
 Take No Prisoners (Molly Hatchet album)
 Live: Take No Prisoners, an album by Lou Reed
 "Take No Prisoners", a song by Megadeth from their fourth album Rust In Peace
 "Take No Prisoners", a song by Janis Ian from her fifteenth album Revenge
"Take No Prisoners", a song by Hot Water Music from their eighth album Exister
 Take No Prisoners (video game), a computer game by Raven Software